The Hanbo scandal (also known as Hanbogate) refers to the late-1990s corruption involving senior South Korean government officials and top executives of the Hanbo Steel (한보그룹) conglomerate, then South Korea’s second biggest steelmaker and 14th biggest conglomerate based on the book value of their assets. The resulting scandal and trial of the first half of 1997 has been described as one of the largest ever scandals in South Korea.

History

Hanbo Steel received illegal preferential treatment from the government of Korean president Kim Young-sam, primarily through loans issued by banks under pressure from bribed high ranking politicians and bankers. Losses from corruption and bribes are estimated at US$6 billion.

Following a trial, by early June 1997 the company's founder, was sentenced to be jailed 15 years. His son, Chung Bo Keun, was jailed for three years. Eight other prominent figures, including former Home Minister Kim Woo Suk, several presidential aides and parliament members, and two former presidents of Korea First Bank were also handed sentences. The son of the president, was arrested in a related investigation and sentenced to three years in October 1997.

Impact
The scandal is seen as having contributed to the Korean economic troubles of that time (see also Asian financial crisis of 1997), exposing South Korean's economy weaknesses and corruption problems to the international financial community. Hanbo was also one of the first in a series of at least ten large South Korean conglomerate bankruptcies that occurred shortly afterward (involving major companies like Kia Motors and Daewoo; the latter also part of a major corruption scandal). The domino effect of collapsing large South Korean companies drove up interest rates and drove away international investors. 

In domestic Korean politics, the son of Kim Young-sam's involvement in the scandal undermined his father's reforms and anti-corruption campaign.

References

1997 crimes in South Korea
Political scandals in South Korea
Corruption in South Korea
Chaebol
Kim Young-sam
1997 scandals